Elbewerft Boizenburg was a German shipbuilding company, headquartered in Boizenburg. Since 1990 it has been part of the Deutschen Maschinen- und Schiffbau AG (DMS AG).

History
The boat workshop was founded by Franz Jürgen Lemm in 1793. The first steel ship was launched in 1895. The shipyard developed quickly, from Elbewerft, Boizenburger Werft to Thomsen & Co, in 1938. After World War II the shipyard was founded as VVW Elbewerft Boizenburg VEB on the basis of Thomsen & Co and after 1945 and the separation of Germany, the shipyard focused on markets in Eastern Europe. In 1970, after fusion with shipyard in Roßlau, Elbewerft Boizenburg became part of VEB Elbewerften Boizenburg/Roßlau, which was one of the most renowned state-owned shipyards of the German Democratic Republic.

Ships built by VEB Elbewerften Boizenburg/Roßlau (selection)

Fishcutters
 Typ Havanna

Container ships
 Typ CBK

River cruise ships
 Vladimir Ilyich (1975)
 30 Let GDR (1980)
 Dmitriy Furmanov (1983)
 Igor Stravinskiy (1983)
 Sergey Dyagilev (1983)
 Aleksey Surkov (1984)
 Konstantin Simonov (1984)
 Sergey Kirov (1987)
 Marshal Rybalko (1988)
 Taras Shevchenko (1991)
 Konstantin Stanyukovich (1991)

See also
Nordic Yards Wismar

References

External links

Shipbuilding companies of Germany
Manufacturing companies established in 1948
Companies based in Mecklenburg-Western Pomerania
1948 establishments in Germany
Companies of East Germany